Sphaerichthys selatanensis, sometimes known as the crossband chocolate gourami, is a species of gourami. It is native to Asia, where it occurs in the Kalimantan region of Borneo in Indonesia. The species reaches 4 cm (1.6 inches) in standard length. It is known to be a facultative air-breather, and males of the species exhibit mouthbrooding.

References 

Luciocephalinae